Allen Edward Everitt (1824 – 11 June 1882) was an English architectural artist and illustrator. He was a leading artist in the Birmingham area between 1850 and 1880, and his work is a valuable historical record of local buildings of that period.

Life and work
Everitt was born in Birmingham, the son of Edward Everitt, an art dealer, and grandson of Allen Everitt, a well-known local artist and art teacher. His maternal grandfather was David Parkes, the Shropshire antiquarian. He showed an early talent for art and received lessons from David Cox, with whom he remained a friend. His specialty was drawing old buildings and their interiors. Taking Birmingham as a centre he made careful drawings of almost every spot in the Midlands of archaeological or historical interest. Between the ages of thirty and forty, he made painting tours of Belgium, France and Germany. After this, he devoted himself particularly to building interiors, his work being mainly carried out in watercolour.

In 1857, Everitt joined the Royal Birmingham Society of Artists, becoming, in 1858, honorary secretary, a post he held until his death. He taught drawing for many years at the Deaf and Dumb Institution in Church Road, Edgbaston, of which he was also, virtually, the secretary. In 1870, the archaeological section of the Midlands Institute was formed, and Everitt was appointed one of its honorary secretaries. He contributed to its journal, "Transactions", with articles on "Aston Church", "Handsworth Church and its surroundings", "Archaeological researches ten miles around Birmingham", "Northfield Church", "Hampton-in-Arden", "Old houses in the Midlands" etc. He was also, for a time, a member of the general council of the Institute. In June 1880, he was appointed honorary curator of the municipal "Birmingham Free Art Gallery", the forerunner of the Birmingham Museum and Art Gallery.

In 1854, Everitt completed a series of drawings of Aston Hall, in Warwickshire, which were used to illustrate Alfred Davidson's History of the Holtes of Aston, Baronets, with a description of the family mansion (see bibliography). He also illustrated John Thackray Bunce's History of old St. Martin's (1875), the parish church of Birmingham.

In 1880, Everitt married Frances Hudson. He died on 11 June 1882, at Edgbaston, where he had lived most of his life, of "congestion of the lungs". His very large collection of sketches has proved to be an invaluable historical record of buildings in the Birmingham area, many of which no longer exist.

See also
Art of Birmingham

References

Bibliography
Books featuring illustrations by Everitt:

External links

A E Everitt (Birmingham Museums and Art Gallery)
Handsworth Views by Allen Edward Everitt (Digital Handsworth)
 
A E Everitt on Artnet

19th-century English painters
English male painters
English watercolourists
English illustrators
Landscape artists
Members and Associates of the Royal Birmingham Society of Artists
People from Birmingham, West Midlands
1824 births
1882 deaths
19th-century English male artists